Collet is both a surname and a given name. Notable people with the name include:

Surname:
 Bernt Johan Collet (born 1941), eldest son of Chamberlain and Master of the Royal Hunt
 Cédric Collet (born 1984), French Guadeloupean football midfielder
 Charles Collet, British Naval airman during the First World War
 Christopher Collet (born 1968), American actor
 Clara Collet (1860–1948), British sociologist
 David Collet (1901–1984), British rower who competed in the 1928 Summer Olympics
 Frédéric Justin Collet (1870–1966), French pathologist and otolaryngologist
 Henri Collet (1885–1951), French composer and music critic
 Hippolyte-Victor Collet-Descotils (1773–1815), French chemist
 Jaume Collet-Serra (born 1974), Spanish-American film director
 John Caskie Collet (1898–1955), United States federal judge in Missouri
 Mark Collet (disambiguation), multiple people with the name
 Philippe Collet (born 1963), retired French pole vaulter
 Pierre Collet (1914–1977), French film actor
 Pierre Collet (physicist) (born 1948), French mathematical physicist,
 Robert Collet (born 1948), French Thoroughbred racehorse trainer
 Ronald Collet Norman (1873–1963), banker, administrator and politician
 Sophia Dobson Collet (1822-1894), feminist
 Stéphane Collet (born 1972), retired French-Malagasy football midfielder
 Vincent Collet (born 1963), French basketball coach

Given name:
 Collet Barker (1784–1831), military officer and explorer
 Collet Bou Gergis, birth name of Dina Hayek (born 1975), a popular Lebanese singer
 Collet Dobson Collet (1812–1898), radical freethinker, Chartist and campaigner against newspaper taxation

Fictional characters:
 Jérôme Collet, The Da Vinci Code character
 Collet Brunel, Tales of Symphonia character